Güneyyaka (literally "south side") is a Turkish place name that may refer to the following places in Turkey:

 Güneyyaka, Bozdoğan, a village in the district of Bozdoğan, Aydın Province
 Güneyyaka, Gündoğmuş, a village in the district of Gündoğmuş, Antalya Province
 Güneyyaka, Söke, a village in the district of Söke, Aydın Province